Brandeis International Business School is part of Brandeis University, located in Waltham, Massachusetts. Brandeis International Business School offers graduate and undergraduate degree programs in business, finance and economics, with over 3,000 alumni in over 100 countries.  By teaching rigorous business, finance and economics, connecting students to best practices and immersing them in international experiences, Brandeis International Business School prepares exceptional individuals from around the globe to become principled professionals in companies and public institutions worldwide.  Peter Petri founded the school, and Bruce R. Magid served as dean of the school from 2007 to 2016, with Peter Petri serving as interim dean from 2016 to 2018. Kathryn Graddy was appointed dean in 2018.

History 
Brandeis University, the parent institution of Brandeis International Business School, was founded in 1948. Brandeis International Business School was first established as the Graduate School of International Economics and Finance (GSIEF), reflecting increased student enrollment in economics and finance courses, and the creation of the PhD in International Economics and Finance in 1994. In 1998, the MBA and Master of Science in Finance (MSF) programs were added, broadening the scope of the school's teaching and research.

The school was renamed Brandeis International Business School in 2003 to reflect this broader expertise and the increasing focus on international and global business. In 2010, Brandeis University introduced a business major and minor, through which undergraduates are able to take graduate classes in management and international finance at Brandeis International Business School. In 2017, the school introduced an Accelerated Master's program in economics and finance.

Academics 
The school focuses on teaching rigorous business, finance and economics, and connecting students to real-world examples and industry practices to immerse them in the fields they wish to work in after graduation. Courses are taught by faculty who bring a blend of academic rigor and practitioner expertise, given students a wide palette of experience to learn from as they explore careers across companies, cultures and countries.

Degree programs offered:
 Master of Arts in International Economics and Finance (MA)
 Masters in Business Administration (MBA)
 Master of Science in Finance (MSF)
 Master of Science in Business Analytics (MSBA)
 PhD in International Economics and Finance
 Dual degree programs, including MSF/MBA, MSBA/MBA, and MSBA/MA
 BA/MA, BA/MBA, and BA/MSBA programs for Brandeis University and partner school undergraduates
 Accelerated MA for undergraduates studying economics and business
 Undergraduate Business Major and Minor
 Undergraduate Economics Major and Minor
Brandeis International Business School allows students to specialize in key areas of business, economics and finance including:
 Applied Economic Analysis
 Asset Management
 Corporate Finance
 Data Analytics
 Financial Economics
 Marketing
 Real Estate
 Risk Management
 Transfer Pricing and Valuation
The school offers STEM (science, technology, engineering and math) designated programs: the Master of Science in Finance (MSF), Master of Arts in International Economics and Finance (MA) and the PhD in International Economics and Finance, as well as one concentration within the Master of Business Administration (MBA), Data Analytics. Under current Department of Education rules, eligible international students are able to work in the United States for up to three years after earning these degrees.

Centers and Initiatives

The school's research addresses various dimensions of international interdependence, including currency markets, asset prices, patents and technology flows, international strategic alliances, trade policy, central banking, international branding and marketing, and multicultural communication. These centers support research and outreach:
 The Asper Center for Global Entrepreneurship
 The Asia Pacific Center for Economics and Business
 Hassenfeld Family Innovation Center 
 Rosenberg Institute of Global Finance
 Perlmutter Institute for Global Business Leadership
 The Latin America Initiative
 The China Initiative
 The Israel Initiative
 The India Initiative
 The Bunson Finance and Society Initiative

Through these centers, Brandeis International Business School has hosted high-profile speakers from business and government, including Viacom CEO Sumner Redstone, Former Treasury Secretary Lawrence Summers, Singapore Ambassador Chan Heng Chee and former Massachusetts Governor Deval Patrick.

The Bloomberg Lab

The Bloomberg Lab gives students access to a world-renowned financial, regulatory and market database that is used by virtually all of the major financial firms and organizations around the globe. Using Bloomberg resources, students are able to store, crunch and analyze information about a comprehensive list of companies. The lab also facilitates workshops on Excel, MATLAB, STATA and other programs to provide students with the opportunity to gain exceptional quantitative skills and extensive experience with global financial modeling.

The Bloomberg Lab is one of the largest in Greater Boston. Each computer has a dual monitor with extensive software offerings, including:
 Bloomberg
 Capital IQ
 CRSP/Compustat
 Datastream
 MATLAB
 Microsoft Office (with Excel plugins for Bloomberg, Morningstar, and Capital IQ)
 Mintel Oxygen
 Morningstar
 SPSS
 STATA
 StatTransfer
 Thomson One
 WRDS

Global Focus 
Hassenfeld Fellow Overseas Immersion Program

A group of students apply and are selected each year to participate in trips abroad in order to further students’ understanding of politics, cultural traditions and geography and economics, as they are essential to understanding how to do business with or in that culture. Past trips have taken place in Panama, Israel, Cuba, Colombia, Turkey and Azerbaijan.

Industry Treks

Students have the opportunity to attend trips that range from day-long excursions to week-long programs that help them learn more about companies, meet alumni and understand career resources within target industries. In 2016, students were able to visit Los Angeles, CA; San Francisco, CA; Washington, DC; New York, NY; Chicago, IL; Dublin, Ireland; and Toronto, Canada.

Study Abroad

For one semester during the spring or fall, students have the option to study abroad in one of 19 universities in 16 different countries.

Some Global Partner Universities include:
 European Business School (Oestrich-Winkel, Germany)
 EADA (Barcelona, Spain)
 ESSEC (Cergy-Pontoise, France)
 Instituto Tecnológico Autónomo de México (Mexico City, Mexico)
 University of Maastricht (Maatricht, Netherlands)
 University of Cape Town (Cape Town, South Africa)
 Universidad de Chile - FEN (Santiago, Chile)
 Tel Aviv University (Tel Aviv, Israel)
 Waseda University (Tokyo, Japan)
 Yonsei University (Seoul, Korea)

Rankings and Accolades 
 No. 2 MA program in the country by The Financial Times
 No. 2 MA program in the world by The TFE Times
 No. 5 MSF program in the country by The TFE Times 
 Ranked among best business schools in North America by The Princeton Review for 9 consecutive years
 Among top programs for Latin American students by América Economía
 Partnership with National Association for Business Economics (NABE) to allow students in the MA program to earn their graduate degree and Certified Business Economist certification simultaneously.
 MSF program is part of the CFA Institute University Recognition Program and the Global Association of Risk Professionals (GARP).

See also
List of United States business school rankings
List of business schools in the United States

External links
 Official website

Brandeis University
Business schools in Massachusetts
Educational institutions established in 1994
Universities and colleges in Middlesex County, Massachusetts
Buildings and structures in Waltham, Massachusetts
University subdivisions in Massachusetts
1994 establishments in Massachusetts